Turkomania refers to Turkmenistan, a country in Central Asia.

Turkomania or Turcomania may also refer to:
 Two competing 14th—15th century confederations of primarily Oghuz Turkic tribes in Western Asia:
 Kara Koyunlu, meaning "of the black sheep," who dominated northwestern Iran (modern-day Iranian Azerbaijan), Kurdistan, and South Caucasus
 Ak Koyunlu, meaning "of the white sheep," who dominated southeastern Turkey, and later all of eastern Turkey, the Caucasus, modern-day Iraq, and Iran
 Turcomania, or Turkmeneli, a political term used to define the territory in which the Iraqi Turkmens historically have had a dominant population

See also 
 Turkmenia (disambiguation)